Donna Malpezzi is an attorney in Pennsylvania, where she is chief counsel for Pennsylvania Senate Majority Leader Dominic F. Pileggi. She also worked as chief counsel for the previous Senate Majority Leader, David J. Brightbill and moved to Pileggi's office after Brightbill was defeated following the 2005 Pennsylvania General Assembly pay raise controversy. Prior to that, she was an attorney in the office of Senator F. Joseph Loeper.

She is generally considered to be the best attorney for drafting legislation in the Pennsylvania General Assembly.  The Insider described her as the "Brightbill Legal Eagle."

In 2005 remarks to the Pennsylvania Senate, Dominic F. Pileggi noted that Malpezzi was "at the center of nearly every budget discussion for our Caucus,"

The Pennsylvania Report named her to the 2003 "The Pennsylvania Report Power 75" list of influential figures in Pennsylvania politics and noted that Malpezzi and her colleague Drew Crompton were the best attorneys in the Pennsylvania State Capitol."  In 2009, she was named to the Pennsylvania Report "PA Report 100" list of politically influential individuals in Pennsylvania.

References

Living people
Employees of the Pennsylvania General Assembly
Pennsylvania lawyers
Year of birth missing (living people)